Cooties Reef is a narrow islet, with an area of 0.15 ha, in south-eastern Australia.  It is part of Tasmania’s Vansittart Island Group, lying in eastern Bass Strait between Flinders and Cape Barren Islands in the Furneaux Group.

Fauna
Pacific gulls breed on the island, and the metallic skink is present. Black-faced cormorants roost on the south side.

References

Furneaux Group